Academy Fantasia (or True Academy Fantasia, formerly UBC Academy Fantasia) is a reality show held in Thailand. It is a singing contest, judged through popular votes.

True Academy Fantasia has terminated its broadcast season with season 12.

Overview

Created by cable TV provider TrueVisions, formerly known as United Broadcasting Corporation (UBC), Academy Fantasia is a franchise of La Academia, a popular reality TV show from Mexico. The contestants are selected through nationwide auditions, as well as through online audition clips. The live auditions take place in major cities in every part of Thailand to search for those who dream about becoming superstars. Four judges will eliminate thousands of people down to top 100 then last twelve or more finalists into the Academy House for study.

The contestants live in the same house with hundreds of hidden cameras. Audiences can watch them 24 hours live on TV and online. Each week the contestants are assigned individual songs and sometimes group songs to perform on stage every Saturday until the last week of the show. The contestants attend voice class, dance class, and acting class to practice the songs that they perform.

The audiences can vote for their favorite contestants through cell phones and land phones. The show usually airs 24 hours on True Vision 20 (digital) and 16 (analog) and the concerts will be broadcast live on True Music Channel (Digital:26, Analog:30) and ModernNine TV (public channel 9) every Saturday night between 20:40-23:10 Thailand time.

After each performance the commentators will evaluate the performance. At the end of the concert, the contestant(s) who received the lowest percentage of audience votes will have to leave the show.
The winners of the first five seasons were all male and was the first female in the season 6. The winners and the runners-up will automatically receive record deals with True Fantasia record label. After the end of each season, there is a nationwide concert tour starring the top 12 finalists.

Seasons

  Male
  Female

Season 1 (2004)
21 June - 21 August 2004 (9 Weeks)

 Week 1 theme: Trainers' Choices
 Week 2 theme: Trainers' Choices
 Week 3 theme: Trainers' Choices
 Week 4 theme: Trainers' Choices
 Week 5 theme: Duets
 Week 6 theme: Easy Listening
 Week 7 theme: International Soundtracks
 Week 8 theme: Rock n' Roll
 Week 9 theme: Contestant's Favourites (Finale)

Season 1: Elimination chart

1None elimination week due to a failure of system supported the votes.

Season 2 (2005)
18 July - 8 October 2005 (12 Weeks)

 Week 1 theme: Songs from Audition Round
 Week 2 theme: 80's
 Week 3 theme: Duets
 Week 4 theme: #1 Hits
 Week 5 theme: Rock n' Roll
 Week 6 theme: Voting Back
 Week 7 theme: World Musics
 Week 8 theme: Songs of "The Soontaraporn"
 Week 9 theme: Dance & Remixes
 Week 10 theme: Thai Local Musics
 Week 11 theme: Movie Hits Soundtracks
 Week 12 theme: Contestant's Favourites (Finale)

Season 2: Elimination chart

1Contestants were voted back and returned to competition once again. The ranking would be reset, but the rewards still were the same.

Season 3 (2006)
3 July - 9 September 2006 (10 Weeks)

 Week 1 theme: His Majesty The King's Songs
 Week 2 theme: Duets
 Week 3 theme: Songs of Contestant's Idols
 Week 4 theme: #1 Hits
 Week 5 theme: Animals Songs
 Week 6 theme: Songs for Mother
 Week 7 theme: Dance n' Hip
 Week 8 theme: Thai Country
 Week 9 theme: Hits Soundtracks
 Week 10 theme: Contestant's Favourites (Finale)

Season 3: Elimination chart

1Contestant had the most popular vote on the special week and get the special prize, a trip to Hong Kong with his mother for one week.

Season 4 (2007)
18 March - 15 October 2007 (12 Weeks & 1 Extra Week)

 Week 1 theme: Semi-finals #1
 Week 2 theme: Semi-finals #2
 Week 3 theme: Thai Contemporary
 Week 4 theme: Boy Band & Girl Group
 Week 5 theme: Thai Country
 Week 6 theme: Cover Hits
 Week 7 theme: Superstars Superhits
 Week 8 theme: Tele Songs
 Week 9 theme: Cheer
 Week 10 theme: Karaoke (Surprised)
 Week 11 theme: Dance
 Week 12 theme: Contestant's Favourites (Finale)
 Week 13 theme: Contestant's The Best of AF4 & His Majesty The King's Songs (The Extra Week)

Season 4: Elimination chart

1Contestant have the most popular vote of the week and can choose two contestants (within top12) back to the competition once again.
2Contestants were selected by the most popular vote contestant of the week to come back into the competition once again, their ranking would be reset.
3Contestant have the most popular vote of the week and receive a special prize, trip to any country in the world.

In the 4th season, AF had 20 contestants go into the Academy house. However, this was still considered the Semi-finals, since there are normally only 12 final contestants in each season. Thus, by the end of the week, 8 of the contestants were supposed to be eliminated, leaving with only 12 people as the real finalists. After the 1st week's performance, the voting results showed that only 3 girls survived to the next round if they really eliminated 8 people. However, this could not happen according to the show's "bible" because in every season, there needs to be 5-7 men & 5-7 women (roughly equal number of men and women among the 12 contestants). Therefore, this week, instead of eliminating the bottom 8, they eliminated only the bottom 4, who were all female. It was also announced that in the following week, 4 male contestants would have to be eliminated, while the female contestants would be safe. In the 2nd week, the bottom 4 male contestants were eliminated by the end of the show.

Season 5 (2008)
12 May - 2 August 2008 (12 Weeks)

 Week 1 Theme: Semi-finals #1
 Week 2 Theme: Semi-finals #2
 Week 3 Theme: Not My Style
 Week 4 Theme: Dance Group
 Week 5 Theme: Thai Contemporary Duets
 Week 6 Theme: Songs of "Asanee-Wasan"
 Week 7 Theme: Indy Music
 Week 8 Theme: Thai Country
 Week 9 Theme: My Favorite Song
 Week 10 Theme: Korean Songs
 Week 11 Theme: The Battle
 Week 12 Theme: Contestant's Favourites (Finale)

1Contestants from online auditions.

Season 5: Elimination chart

1Contestants from online auditions.
2Contestant was the 2nd place popular vote of the week and received the Immunity Idol which could help her save herself from an elimination.
3None eliminated because a contestant decided to use the Immunity Idol to save herself from elimination.
4Contestants were given a chance to return into the Academy house just one week. There would be only 1 contestant can return to the competition again.
5Contestant got the most popular vote in the voting back week, and can return into the competition once again.

In the 5th season, 16 contestants were admitted to the Academy house, so in the first week 4 contestants were supposed to be eliminated (one male and one female from the online auditions, and one male and one female from live auditions.) At the actual concert, though, the audience and the contestants were surprised when only 2 female contestants were eliminated (one from online auditions and one from live auditions), so 2 male contestants (one from the clip auditions and one from the live auditions) would be eliminated in week 2.

Season 6 (2009)
28 June - 19 September 2009 (12 Weeks)

 Week 1 Theme: My Style
 Week 2 Theme: Party & Radio Hits
 Week 3 Theme: Tributed to King of Pop "Michael Jackson"
 Week 4 Theme: Hard Rock
 Week 5 Theme: Dance
 Week 6 Theme: Show Power
 Week 7 Theme: Mother's Choice
 Week 8 Theme: The Battle
 Week 9 Theme: Featuring with Our Friend
 Week 10 Theme: Thai Country
 Week 11 Theme: The Musical
 Week 12 Theme: My Dream with My Songs (Finale)

Season 6: Elimination chart

Season 7 (2010)
27 June - 18 September 2010 (12 Weeks)

 Week 1 Theme: Top 100 Semi-final Audition
 Week 2 Theme: Rock
 Week 3 Theme: Hot Debut (During years contestants were born, 1988–1995)
 Week 4 Theme: Korean Songs
 Week 5 Theme: Single Show (Contestant's Choice)
 Week 6 Theme: Songs for Mother
 Week 7 Theme: Music Festival (International Hits)
 Week 8 Theme: Tag Teams (Duet & Battle Songs)
 Week 9 Theme: Songs of Thongchai McIntyre (Musical Part I)
 Week 10 Theme: Thai Contemporary & Country (Musical Part II)
 Week 11 Theme: Variety Dance
 Week 12 Theme: Grand Finale

1Ton (V13) replaced Mark (V11), who retired the show at the end of concert week 3.

Season 7: Elimination chart

Season 8 (2011)
26 June - 17 September 2011 (12 week)

 Week 1 Theme: Semi-final #1
 Week 2 Theme: Semi-final #2 - Duo Song
 Week 3 Theme: Semi-final #3 - Thanks & Gives
 Week 4 Theme: Tata Young & Jirasak Parnpum
 Week 5 Theme: Hearthbroken
 Week 6 Theme: In Love
 Week 7 Theme: Variety Dance
 Week 8 Theme: Killer Song
 Week 9 Theme: The King's Songs, Thai Contemporary & Thai Country
 Week 10 Theme: Musical
 Week 11 Theme: Songs of 'Ohm Chatri' & 'Dee Nitipong'
 Week 12 Theme: Grand Final

Season 8: Elimination chart

Season 9 (2012)
2 June - 15 September 2012 (15 Weeks)

 Week 1 Theme: My Chosen Song #1
 Week 2 Theme: My Chosen Song #2
 Week 3 Theme: My Chosen Song #3
 Week 4 Theme: 12 Dream 12 Style
 Week 5 Theme: Re-stage: Friend's song
 Week 6 Theme: Thai's life
 Week 7 Theme: First Love
 Week 8 Theme: Killer Songs
 Week 9 Theme: The Battle: Senior's Song
 Week 10 Theme: Mothers' Generation Songs
 Week 11 Theme: Dance City
 Week 12 Theme: Duets
 Week 13 Theme: Musical
 Week 14 Theme: Settha Sirachaya
 Week 15 Theme: Grand Final

Season 9: Elimination chart

Season 10 (2013)
24 June - 14 September 2013 (12 Weeks)

 Week 1 Theme: My Style
 Week 2 Theme: My Steps
 Week 3 Theme: My Scenes
 Week 4 Theme: My Minute
 Week 5 Theme: My Duet
 Week 6 Theme: My Weakness
 Week 7 Theme: My Buddy
 Week 8 Theme: My Beat
 Week 9 Theme: My Thai Thai
 Week 10 Theme: My Stage (AF10 The Musical)
 Week 11 Theme: My Voice My Music
 Week 12 Theme: My Dream

Team

 Week 1-6
ทีม ฝันและใฝ่
 V1 Ten
 V3 Fluke
 V4 Mook
 V5 Lisa
 V7 Aee
 V9 Benz
 V10 Tangtai
 V12 Mangpor
 V13 Thung
 V15 Beam
 V22 CoNan
 V24 Belle
ทีม ฝากรัก
 V2 Taengmo
 V6 Tayme
 V8 Tong
 V11 Nan
 V14 Hernfah
 V16 Ton
 V17 Ryu
 V18 Nene
 V19 Prim
 V20 Tungbeer
 V21 Tuey
 V23 Hongyok

 Week 7
ทีม ฝันและใฝ่
 V1 Ten
 V3 Fluke
 V4 Mook
 V9 Benz
 V13 Thung
 V15 Beam
 V22 CoNan
 V24 Belle
ทีม ฝากรัก
 V2 Taengmo
 V6 Tayme
 V8 Tong
 V10 Tangtai
 V11 Nan
 V14 Hernfah
 V18 Nene
 V20 Tungbeer
 V21 Tuey
 V23 Hongyok

 Week 8-9
ทีม ฝันและใฝ่
 V3 Fluke
 V4 Mook
 V10 Tangtai
 V13 Thung
 V15 Beam
 V20 Tungbeer
 V22 CoNan
 V24 Belle
ทีม ฝากรัก
 V2 Taengmo
 V6 Tayme
 V8 Tong
 V11 Nan
 V14 Hernfah
 V18 Nene
 V21 Tuey
 V23 Hongyok

Season 10: Elimination chart

Season 11 (2014)
20 July - 4 October 2014 (11 Weeks)

 Week 1 Theme: My Style
 Week 2 Theme: Boy Band & Girl Group
 Week 3 Theme: Mother's Choice
 Week 4 Theme: Duets
 Week 5 Theme: Thai Country
 Week 6 Theme: Midterm
 Week 7 Theme: The Battle
 Week 8 Theme: Solo Dance
 Week 9 Theme: Musical
 Week 10 Theme: Producers Choices
 Week 11 Theme: Grand Final

Season 11: Elimination chart

Season 12 (2015)
28 June - 19 September 2015 (12 Weeks)

 Week 1 Theme: Trainers Choices
 Week 2 Theme: Trainers Choices
 Week 3 Theme: Trainers Choices
 Week 4 Theme: Entertain & Emotional
 Week 5 Theme: Duets
 Week 6 Theme: Songs For Mom
 Week 7 Theme: The Battle
 Week 8 Theme: Thai Country & Thai Contemporary
 Week 9 Theme: Party Dance
 Week 10 Theme: Musical
 Week 11 Theme: Tribute Carabao
 Week 12 Theme: Grand Finale

Season 12: Elimination chart

External links

 Main Site
 True AF 6
 True AF 5
 Fan Site
 AF Talk
 AF Club
 AF Studio
 Academy Fant.asia

 
MCOT HD original programming
Thai reality television series
2004 Thai television series debuts
La Academia
2000s Thai television series